The 2006 South Carolina gubernatorial election took place on November 7, 2006. Incumbent Republican Governor Mark Sanford won re-election against Democratic State Senator Tommy Moore, becoming only the third Republican governor in South Carolina to win a second term (Robert Kingston Scott and Carroll A. Campbell Jr. were the others). Sanford started the campaign with a double-digit edge over Moore and he maintained that lead to election day. During the course of the campaign, Sanford's approval rating averaged in the mid-fifties. In Sanford's re-election victory, he also garnered 22% of the African American vote.

Democratic primary
Tommy Moore, a State Senator from western South Carolina, emerged with Florence Mayor Frank Willis as the major candidates in the Democratic primary election for governor. Rumors circulated that Superintendent of Education and former U.S. Senate candidate, Inez Tenenbaum, might enter the race, but she ultimately chose not to run for governor nor seek re-election to her position. Kenneth Holland, a former U.S. Representative from the 5th congressional district, briefly entered the race, but dropped out a month later after failing to raise enough financial contributions.

Moore and Willis traded barbs over campaign contributions made by Willis and his wife to prominent Republicans, including President George W. Bush and Senator Lindsey Graham. Attorney C. Dennis Aughtry entered the campaign at the eleventh hour and floated the idea of legalizing casinos statewide to raise money for public schools. Moore garnered more than 50% of the vote in the Democratic primary held on June 13 and thus avoided a runoff election.

Republican primary
Portending a sign of trouble, incumbent Governor Mark Sanford faced a primary challenge from Oscar Lovelace, a physician from the Midlands. When former Governor David Beasley ran for re-election in 1998, he faced a primary challenge and went on to lose the general election to Jim Hodges. Sanford's veto of a heart center for Lexington County and theatrics such as bringing pigs to the Statehouse to show his displeasure of pork barrel spending by the General Assembly angered and annoyed many Republicans. However, Sanford's strategy of avoiding Lovelace and refusal to debate worked as the governor scored a decisive victory in the primary on June 13.

Campaign
Governor Mark Sanford proposed three major issues in his campaign for re-election, chief among them being the restructuring of state government. He wanted to reduce the number of statewide elected officials from nine to three and eliminate the state's Budget and Control Board. The governor insisted that these measures would reduce the number of redundant positions and make state government both more efficient and less costly. Sanford's three major issues for the campaign were:
Restructuring state government.
School choice through tuition tax credits.
Tax cuts and spending restraint.

State Senator Tommy Moore ran as a good manager of state government. He held socially conservative and fiscally moderate positions, which put him squarely at odds with the libertarian incumbent. Moore disagreed with what he believed was Sanford's condescending and combative approach of dealing with the General Assembly. The senator also believed that Sanford lacked leadership skills, and that lack of leadership had brought South Carolina to a standstill over the past four years in his view. The main policy proposals that he developed were:
A rural infrastructure bank to help undeveloped counties.
A governor's office that actively recruits new businesses to the state.
A 30-cent tax increase on cigarettes to offset small business tax credits for employee health insurance.

On July 7, several weeks after the primary election, Lexington County State Senator Jake Knotts launched a last-minute effort to place his name on the ballot as a petition candidate for governor. He had feuded with Governor Sanford over a number of issues, including the heart center for Lexington County, and supported Lovelace in the Republican primary. In order to be on the ballot in November, Knotts needed to collect 10,000 signatures of registered voters by July 17, which he failed to do. Knotts's political consultant publicly stated that he could not have raised enough money to have run a successful candidacy.

There were two trains of thought on the effects of a candidacy by Knotts. It was generally believed that had Knotts entered the race, it would have split the Republican vote and helped elect Tommy Moore. However, because those who supported Knotts went on to support Moore, it was also argued that a Knotts candidacy would have in fact deprived Moore of both votes and money.

Predictions

Polling

Election results

|-
| 
| colspan=5 |Republican hold
|-

See also
2006 United States gubernatorial elections
Governor of South Carolina
List of governors of South Carolina
South Carolina gubernatorial elections
2006 South Carolina state elections

References

External links
Tommy Moore (D) for Governor
Mark Sanford (R) for Governor
Dennis Aughtry (D) for Governor
2006 South Carolina Contest Results for Governor

Gubernatorial
2006
2006 United States gubernatorial elections